Alton Lavan (September 13, 1946 – April 23, 2018) was an American football player and coach.  He served as the head football coach at Delaware State University from 2004 to 2010. Lavan was also as the interim head football coach at Eastern Michigan University for the final three games of the 2003 season, after replacing Jeff Woodruff. He played college football at Colorado State University and professionally with the Atlanta Falcons of the National Football League (NFL).

Raised in Newark, New Jersey, Lavan played prep football at South Side High School, which has since be renamed as Malcolm X Shabazz High School.

As a longtime running backs coach, he coached the following players throughout his various tenures: Tony Dorsett, Herschel Walker, Eddie Lee Ivery, Drew Hill, Bam Morris, Earnest Byner, Leroy Hoard, Priest Holmes, Napoleon Kaufman, Errict Rhett, Roosevelt Potts, Donnell Bennett, Tony Richardson, and Kimble Anders.

Head coaching record

References

External links
 

1946 births
2018 deaths
American football defensive backs
Atlanta Falcons coaches
Atlanta Falcons players
Baltimore Ravens coaches
Colorado State Rams football coaches
Colorado State Rams football players
Dallas Cowboys coaches
Delaware State Hornets football coaches
Eastern Michigan Eagles football coaches
Georgia Tech Yellow Jackets football coaches
Iowa State Cyclones football coaches
Kansas City Chiefs coaches
Louisville Cardinals football coaches
Malcolm X Shabazz High School alumni
San Francisco 49ers coaches
Stanford Cardinal football coaches
Washington Huskies football coaches
People from Bartow, Florida
People from Fort Pierce, Florida
Sportspeople from Newark, New Jersey
Players of American football from Florida
Players of American football from Newark, New Jersey
African-American coaches of American football
African-American players of American football
20th-century African-American sportspeople
21st-century African-American sportspeople